(born 23 March 1965, in Akita) is a former Japanese rugby union player and a coach. He played as a prop.

Career
Ota had 27 caps for Japan, from 1986 to 1995, scoring a try, 5 points in aggregate. He played twice at the Rugby World Cup, being a totalist in the 1991 Rugby World Cup, with three games, and at the 1995 Rugby World Cup, again with three games played. That was the last time he played for the National Team.

Ota, after finishing his player career, become a coach. He was coach of NEC. He was general manager of Japan Rugby Football Union when he took charge as caretaker head coach of the "Brave Blossoms", in September 2006, after the sacking of Jean-Pierre Élissalde. He announced that the new head coach of Japan would be John Kirwan, in October, remaining in office until 1 January 2007.

External links
 Osamu Ota International Statistics
 Official Blog (Japanese)

1965 births
Living people
Japanese rugby union players
Japanese rugby union coaches
Green Rockets Tokatsu players
Rugby union props
Japan international rugby union players